Ahmed Raza Khan, commonly known as Aala Hazrat, Ahmed Raza Khan Barelvi, or Ahmed Rida Khan in Arabic,  (14 June 1856 CE or 10 Shawwal 1272 AH – October 1921 CE or Safar 1340 AH), was an Islamic scholar, jurist, mufti, philosopher, theologian, ascetic, Sufi, poet, and mujaddid in British India.

He wrote on law, religion, philosophy and the sciences, and because he mastered many subjects in both rational and religious sciences, Francis Robinson, one of the leading Western scholars of South Asian Islam, considers him to be a polymath.

He was reformer in north India who wrote extensively in defense of Muhammad and popular Sufi practices and became the leader of a movement called "Ahl-i Sunnat wa Jamàat". He influenced millions of people, and today the Barelvi movement has around 200 million in the region.

Biography

Family
Khan was born on 14 June 1856 in Mohallah Jasoli, Bareilly, the North-Western Provinces. The name corresponding to the year of his birth was "Al Mukhtaar". His birth name was Muhammad. Khan used the appellation "Abdul Mustafa" ("servant of the chosen one") prior to signing his name in correspondence.

Teachers
According to the official Biography written by Molana Zafar Uddin Bihari, some of his famous teachers included:
Shah AI-i-Rasul (d. 1297/1879)
Naqi Ali Khan (d. 1297/1880)
Ahmad Zayni Dahlan Makki (d. 1299/1881)
Abd al-Rahman Siraj Makki (d. 1301/1883)
Hussayn bin Saleh (d. 1302/1884)
Abul-Hussayn Ahmad Al-Nuri (d. 1324/1906)
'Abd al-Ali Rampuri (d. 1303/1885)

Spiritual order
In the year 1294 A.H. (1877), at the age of 22 years, Ahmed Raza became the Mureed (disciple) of Shah Aale Rasool Marehrawi. His Murshid bestowed him with Khilafat in several Sufi Silsilas. Some Islamic scholars received permission from him to work under his guidance.

Ahle Sunnat Revival movement
Imam Ahmed Raza wrote extensively in defense of his views, countered the Wahabism and Deobandi movements, and, by his writing and activity, became the leader of the Ahle Sunnat movement. The movement is spread across the globe with followers in Pakistan, India, South Africa and Bangladesh. The movement now has over 200 million followers globally. The movement was largely a rural phenomenon when began but is currently popular among urban, educated Pakistanis and Indians as well as the South Asian diaspora throughout the world.

Death
Ahmed Raza Khan died in October 1921 (Safar 1340 AH) at the age of 65. He is buried in his hometown of Bareilly.

Imam Ahmed Raza Khan wrote several hundred books in Arabic, Persian, and Urdu, including the thirty-volume fatwa compilation Fatawa Razaviyya, and Kanzul Iman (Translation & Explanation of the Qur'an). Several of his books have been translated into European and South Asian languages.

Kanz ul Iman (translation of the Qur'an)
Kanzul Iman (Urdu and Arabic: کنزالایمان) is a 1910 Urdu paraphrase translation of the Qur'an by Khan. It is associated with the Hanafi jurisprudence within Sunni Islam, and is a widely read version of the translation in the Indian Subcontinent.
It has been translated into English, Hindi, Bengali, Dutch, Turkish, Sindhi, Gujarati, and Pashto, and also recently translated into Gojri language by Mufti Nazir Ahmed Qadri.

Husam ul Haramain
Husamul Haramain or Husam al Harmain Ala Munhir kufr wal mayn (The Sword of the Haramayn at the throat of unbelief and falsehood) 1906, is a treatise which declared infidels the founders of the Deobandi, Ahl-i Hadith and Ahmadiyya movements on the basis that they did not have the proper veneration of Muhammad and finality of prophethood in their writings. In defense of his verdict he obtained confirmatory signatures from 268 scholars in South Asia, and some from scholars in Mecca and Medina. The treatise is published in Arabic, Urdu, English, Turkish and Hindi.

Fatawa Razawiyyah

Fatawa-e-Razvia or the full name Al Ataya fi-Nabaviah Fatwa Razaviah  (translates to Verdicts of Imam Ahmed Raza by the blessings of the Prophet) is the main fatwa (Islamic verdicts on various issues) book of his movement. It has been published in 30 volumes and in approx. 22,000 pages. It contains solutions to daily problems from religion to business and from war to marriage.

Hadaiq-e-Bakhshish
He wrote na'at (devotional poetry in praise of Muhammad) and always discussed him in the present tense. His main book of poetry is Hadaiq-e-Bakhshish.
His poems, which deal for the most part with the qualities of Muhammad, often have a simplicity and directness. 
His Urdu couplets, entitled Mustafa Jaane Rahmat pe Lakhon Salaam (Millions of salutations on Mustafa, the Paragon of mercy), are recited in mosques globally. They contain praise of Muhammad, his physical appearance (verses 33 to 80), his life and times, praise of his family and companions, praise of the awliya and saleheen (the saints and the pious).

Al Daulatul Makkiya Bil Madatul Ghaibiya
In 1323 Hijri (1905), Ahmad Raza went for his second Haj. Allamah Shaikh Saleh Kamal a Alim of Makkatul Mukarrama, he presented five questions to Ahmad Raza on behalf of the Ulema of Makkatul Mukarrama, this question was asked by Makkatul Mukarrama Wahabi Ulema regarding Knowledge of the Unseen (Ilm-e-Ghaib) Prophet of Islam. At that time Ahmed Raza was suffering from a high fever, despite the illness he tried to answer all the questions, he answered in such detail that the answer took the form of a book, and  this book was named  Al Daulatul Makkiya Bil Madatul Ghaibiya.

Jamat Raza E Mustafa
Khan  founded an organization on 17 December 1920 and named it Jamat Raza E Mustafa.

Other notable works
His other works include:
Al Mu'tamadul Mustanad
Al Amn o wal Ula
Alkaukabatush Shahabiya
Al Istimdaad
Al Fuyoozul Makkiyah
Al Meeladun Nabawiyyah
Fauze Mubeen Dar Radd-E-Harkate Zameen
Subhaanus Subooh
Sallus Say yaaful Hindiya
Ahkaam-e-Shariat
Az Zubdatuz Zakkiya
Abna ul Mustafa
Tamheed-e-Imaan
Angoothe Choomne ka Masla

Beliefs 

Khan saw an intellectual and moral decline of Muslims in British India. His movement was a mass movement, defending popular Sufism, which grew in response to the influence of the Deobandi movement in South Asia and the Wahhabi movement elsewhere.

Imam Ahmed Raza Khan supported Tawassul, Mawlid, Muhammad's awareness of complete knowledge of the unseen, and other practices which were opposed by Salafis and Deobandis.

In this context he supported the following beliefs:
 Prophet Muhammad was not made of flesh, but of nur (light), and is ever-present all around us. This contrasts with the Deobandi view that Muhammad was the insan-i-kamil (perfect person), but still a mortal human, not divine.
 Prophet Muhammad is haazir naazir (Haazir-o-Naazir on the deeds of his Ummah) which means that Muhammad views and witnesses the actions of his people.
This concept was interpreted by Shah Abdul Aziz in Tafsir Azizi in these words: The prophet is observing everybody, knows their good and bad deeds, and knows the strength of faith (Imaan) of every individual Muslim and what has hindered his spiritual progress.

He reached judgments with regard to certain practices and faith in his book Fatawa-e-Razvia, including:

Islamic Law is the ultimate law and following it is obligatory for all Muslims;
To refrain from Bid'ah is essential;
It is impermissible to imitate the Kuffar, to mingle with the misguided [and heretics], and to participate in their festivals.

Fatwas

Ahmadis 
Mirza Ghulam Ahmad of Qadian claimed to be the Messiah, Prophet, and Mahdi awaited by some Muslims as well as a Ummati Nabi, a subordinate prophet to Muhammad who came to restore Islam to the pristine form as practiced by Muhammad and early Sahaba. Khan declared Mirza Ghulam Ahmad a heretic and apostate and called him and his followers disbelievers (kuffar).

Deobandis 
The theological difference with the Deobandi school began when Maulana Ahmed Raza Khan Qadri objected in writing to some of the following beliefs of Deobandi scholars.
A founder of the Deobandi movement, Rashid Ahmad Gangohi stated that God has the ability to lie. This doctrine is called Imkan-i Kizb. According to this doctrine, because God is omnipotent, God is capable of lying. Gangohi supported the doctrine that God has the ability to make additional prophets after Muhammad (Imkan-i Nazir) and other prophets equal to Muhammad.
He opposed the doctrine that Muhammad has knowledge of the unseen (Ilm e Ghaib).
When Ahmed Raza Khan visited Mecca and Medina for pilgrimage in 1905, he prepared a draft document entitled Al Motamad Al Mustanad ("The Reliable Proofs"). In this work, Ahmad Raza branded Deobandi leaders such as Ashraf Ali Thanwi, Rashid Ahmad Gangohi, and Muhammad Qasim Nanotwi and those who followed them as kuffar. Khan collected scholarly opinions in the Hejaz and compiled them in an Arabic language compendium with the title, Hussam al Harmain ("The Sword of Two Sanctuaries"), a work containing 34 verdicts from 33 ulama (20 Meccan and 13 Medinese).

 This work initiated a reciprocal series of fatwas between Ahle Sunnat (Barelvis) and Deobandis lasting to the present.

Shia 
Ahmed Raza Khan wrote various books against the beliefs and faith of Shia Muslims and declared various practices of Shia as kufr. He considered most Shiites of his day apostates because, he believed, they repudiated necessities of religion.

Wahabi Movement 
Ahmed Raza Khan declared Wahabis as disbelievers (kuffar) and collected many fatwas of various scholars against the Wahhabi movement founded by Muhammad ibn Abd al-Wahhab, who was predominant in the Arabian peninsula, just as he had done with the Ahmadis and Deobandis. Until this day, Khan's followers remain opposed to the Wahhabi and their beliefs.

Permissibility of currency notes 
In 1905, Khan, on the request of contemporaries from Hijaz, wrote a verdict on the permissibility of using paper as a form of currency, entitled Kifl-ul-Faqeehil fehim Fe Ahkam-e-Kirtas Drahim.

Political views
Unlike other Muslim leaders in the region at the time, Khan and his movement opposed the Indian independence movement due to its leadership under Mahatma Gandhi, who was not a Muslim.

Imam Ahmed Raza Khan declared that India was Dar al-Islam and that Muslims enjoyed religious freedom there. According to him, those arguing the contrary merely wanted to take advantage of the provisions allowing Muslims living under the non-Muslim rule to collect interest from commercial transactions and had no desire to fight Jihad or perform Hijra. Therefore, he opposed labeling British India to be Dar al-Harb ("abode of war"), which meant that waging holy war against and migrating from India were inadmissible as they would cause disaster to the community. This view of Khan's was similar to other reformers Syed Ahmed Khan and Ubaidullah Al Ubaidi Suhrawardy.

The Muslim League mobilized the Muslim masses to campaign for Pakistan, and many of Khan's followers played a significant and active role in the Pakistan Movement at educational and political fronts.

Legacy
Many religious schools, organizations, and research institutions teach Khan's ideas, which emphasize the primacy of Islamic law along with the adherence to Sufi practices and personal devotion to Muhammad.

Recognition
 On 21 June 2010, Muhammad al-Yaqoubi, a cleric and Sufi from Syria, declared on Takbeer TV's program Sunni Talk that the Mujaddid of the Indian subcontinent was Ahmed Raza Khan Barelvi, and said that a follower of Ahlus Sunnah wal Jamaah can be identified by his love of Khan and that those outside of that those outside the Ahlus Sunnah are identified by their attacks on him.
 Allama Muhammad Iqbal (1877–1938), a poet, Sufi, and philosopher, said: "I have carefully studied the decrees of Ahmed Raza and thereby formed this opinion; and his Fatawa bear testimony to his acumen, intellectual caliber, the quality of his creative thinking, his excellent jurisdiction and his ocean-like Islamic knowledge. Once Imam Ahmed Raza forms an opinion he stays firm on it; he expresses his opinion after a sober reflection. Therefore, the need never arises to withdraw any of his religious decrees and judgments. In another place he says, "Such a genius and intelligent jurist did not emerge."
 Prof. Sir Ziauddin Ahmad, who was the head of the department of Mathematics at Aligarh University, was once unable to find solutions to some mathematic algorithms, even after he took help from the mathematicians abroad. He decided to visit Germany for the solution but at the request of his friend Sayyed Suleman Ashraf who was a professor of Islamic Studies at Aligarh University and also the mureed (disciple) of Ahmed Raza, Ziauddin visited Ahmed Raza on a special visit to get answers to his difficult questions, and under the guidance of Ahmed Raza he finally succeeded in getting solutions.
 Justice Naeemud'deen, Supreme Court of Pakistan: "Maulana Ahmad Raza's grand personality, a representation of our most esteemed ancestors, is history-making, and a history uni-central in his self. ... You may estimate his high status from the fact that he spent all his life in expressing the praise of the great and auspicious Holy Prophet (صلی اللہ علیہ وسلم), in defending his veneration, in delivering speeches regarding his unique conduct, and in promoting and spreading the Law of Shariah which was revealed upon him for the entire humanity of all times. His renowned name is 'Muhammad' (صلی اللہ علیہ وسلم), the Prophet of Almighty Allah. ... The valuable books written by an encyclopedic scholar like Ahmed Raza, in my view, are the lamps of light that will keep enlightened and radiant the hearts and minds of the men of knowledge and insight for a long time."

Societal influence
 Ala Hazrat Express is an express train belonging to Indian Railways that runs between Bareilly and Bhuj in India.
 The Indian government issued a commemorative postal stamp in honor of Ahmad Raza Khan on 31 December 1995.
 Aala Hazrat Haj House Ghaziabad, Uttar Pradesh
 Aala Hazrat Hospital Ghaziabad, Uttar Pradesh
 Ala Hazrat Terminal, Bareilly Airport, Bareilly, Uttar Pradesh
 Raza Academy

Spiritual successors
Imam Ahmed Raza Khan had two sons and five daughters. His sons Hamid Raza Khan and Mustafa Raza Khan Qadri are celebrated scholars of Islam. Hamid Raza Khan was his appointed successor. After him Mustafa Raza Khan succeeded his father, who then appointed Akhtar Raza Khan as his successor. His son, Mufti Asjad Raza Khan now succeeds him as the spiritual leader.
He had many disciples and successors, including 30 in the Indian subcontinent and 35 elsewhere.
The following scholars are his notable successors:
Hamid Raza Khan (d. 1875/1943)
Mustafa Raza Khan (d. 1892/1981)
Amjad Ali Aazmi (d. 1882/1948)
Muhammad Abdul Aleem Siddiqi
Naeem-ud-Deen Muradabadi
Zafaruddin Bihari (d. 1886/1962) 
Abul Muhamid al-Ashrafi al-Jilani (d. 1894/1961)
Hashmat Ali Khan (d. 1901/1960)
Maulana Ziauddin Madani (d. 1877/1981)

Educational influence
Al Jamiatul Ashrafia is the main educational institute and learning center that provides Islam education.
Raza Academy publishing house in Mumbai
Imam Ahmed Raza Academy Durban, South Africa

See also
 Dargah-e-Ala Hazrat
 Karwan-I-Islami
 Hassan Raza Khan
 Asjad Raza Khan
 Hamid Raza Khan
 Akhtar Raza Khan
 Mohammad Abdul Ghafoor Hazarvi
 Mustafa Raza Khan
 Qamaruzzaman Azmi
 Raza Academy
 Amjad Ali Aazmi
 Ilyas Qadri

References

Bibliography
 Baraka, A. (2003). A Saviour in a Dark World (Article). The Islamic Times, March 2003. Stockport, UK: Raza Academy.

 Haroon, Muhammad.  (1994). The World Importance of Imam Ahmed Raza Khan Barelvi. Stockport, UK: Raza Academy. 
 Imam, Muhammad Hassan. (2005). The Role of the Khulafa-e-Imam Ahmed Raza Khan in Pakistan Movement 1920–1947. Diss. Karachi: University of Karachi.
 Azimbadi, Badr. (2005).Great Personalities in Islam. Adam Publishers.

External links

English books of Imam Ahmed Raza Qadri
 Full Biography of Ala Hazrat in Urdu
 Official website of Dargah Imam Ahmad Raza

 
Islam in India
1856 births
1921 deaths
Ahmed
Barelvi
Barelvis
Mujaddid
Indian Sufis
Sunni imams
Critics of Shia Islam
Hanafi fiqh scholars
Hanafis
Maturidis
Indian Sunni Muslim scholars of Islam
Translators of the Quran into Urdu
Writers in British India
Barech
Indian male poets
Poets in British India
Poets from Uttar Pradesh
Muslim reformers
Scholars from Uttar Pradesh
People from Bareilly
People from Bareilly district
Founders of Indian schools and colleges
19th-century Indian poets
20th-century Indian poets
20th-century Indian non-fiction writers
20th-century Muslim scholars of Islam
Indian Sunni Muslims
Critics of Ahmadiyya
Indian people of Pashtun descent